Nand or NAND may refer to:

Computing
 Logical NAND or nand, a binary operation in logic (Not AND)
 NAND gate, an electronic gate that implements a logical NAND
 Janov lulek, methods of building other logic gates using just NAND gates
 NAND flash memory, a type of non-volatile computer memory

People
 Nand Kishore (cricketer, born 1970), Indian former cricketer
 Nand Kishore Garg (born 1949), senior social worker
 Nand Gopal Gupta (born 1974), former Minister of Homeopathy in the Government of Uttar Pradesh
 Nainendra Nand, Solicitor-General of Fiji from 1997 to 2006
 Nand Kumar Patel (1953–2013), Indian National Congress politician from the Chhattisgarh
 Nand Singh (1914–1947), Indian recipient of the Victoria Cross
 Lisa Francesca Nand (born 1974), journalist
 Nand Lal Noorpuri (died 1966), Punjabi poet, writer and lyricist

Other uses
 Nand Dam, the Lower Wunna Dam over the Nand river
 Nanda Baba or Nand, a figure in Hindu mythology
Nand (TV series), a Pakistani TV series produced by ARY Digital

See also
 Nanda (disambiguation)